Jarmila Šťastná (1 July 1932 – 24 May 2015) was a Czech speed skater. She competed in three events at the 1964 Winter Olympics.

References

External links
 

1932 births
2015 deaths
Czech female speed skaters
Olympic speed skaters of Czechoslovakia
Speed skaters at the 1964 Winter Olympics
People from Olomouc District
Sportspeople from the Olomouc Region